My Hero is a 1912 American short silent Western film directed by D. W. Griffith and starring Dorothy Gish.

Cast
 Dorothy Gish as The Young Woman
 Walter P. Lewis as The Young Woman's Father (as Walter Lewis)
 Robert Harron as The Young Man
 Henry B. Walthall as Indian Charlie
 Lionel Barrymore
 Kate Bruce as The Young Woman's Mother (unconfirmed)
 W. Christy Cabanne as Settler
 Harry Carey as Indian
 John T. Dillon as Man in Room
 Frank Evans as Settler
 Frank Lanning as Indian
 J. Jiquel Lanoe as Settler
 Adolph Lestina as Settler
 Charles Hill Mailes as Indian
 Alfred Paget as Indian
 W. C. Robinson as Indian/Man in Room
 Hector Sarno as Indian (as Hector V. Sarno)
 Charles West as Settler (as Charles H. West)

See also
 Harry Carey filmography
 D. W. Griffith filmography
 Lionel Barrymore filmography

References

External links
 

1912 films
1912 short films
1912 Western (genre) films
American silent short films
American black-and-white films
Films directed by D. W. Griffith
Silent American Western (genre) films
1910s American films
1910s English-language films